Igor Grinko (17 February 1946 – 17 March 2014) was a Russian rowing coach.

Students: Jüri Jaanson.

Awards:
 2004: Estonian Coach of the Year

References

1946 births
2014 deaths
Russian sports coaches